BanG Dream! is a Japanese music media franchise with the premise of all-female bands whose members are also voice actresses for the project's anime series and mobile game BanG Dream! Girls Band Party!. , the franchise consists of seven bands, four of which perform live concerts: Poppin'Party (formed in 2015), Roselia (2017), Raise A Suilen (2018), and Morfonica (2020). The launch of the game in 2017 also introduced three bands—Afterglow, Pastel Palettes, and Hello, Happy World!—that do not have musical experience, and their members are limited to vocals during live shows.

Official concerts

2015

2016

2017

2018

2019

2020

2021

2022

Concert tours

Collaborations and guest appearances

References

Live
BanG Dream
BanG Dream